Vijay Dhondopant Tendulkar (6 January 1928 – 19 May 2008) was a leading Indian playwright, movie and television writer, literary essayist, political journalist, and social commentator primarily in Marāthi. His Marathi plays established him as a writer of plays with contemporary, unconventional themes. He is best known for his plays Shantata! Court Chalu Aahe (1967), Ghāshirām Kotwāl (1972), and Sakhārām Binder (1972). Many of Tendulkar's plays derived inspiration from real-life incidents or social upheavals, which provide clear light on harsh realities. He has provided guidance to students studying "play writing" in US universities. Tendulkar was a dramatist and theatre personality in Mahārāshtra for over five decades.

Early life
Vijay Dhondopant Tendulkar was born in a Gaud Saraswat Brahmin family on 6 January 1928 in Girgaon, Mumbai, Maharashtra, where his father held a clerical job and ran a small publishing business. The literary environment at home prompted young Vijay to take up writing. He wrote his first story at age six.

He grew up watching western plays and felt inspired to write plays himself. At age eleven, he wrote, directed, and acted in his first play.

At age 14, he participated in the 1942 Indian freedom movement, leaving his studies. The latter alienated him from his family and friends. Writing then became his outlet, though most of his early writings were of a personal nature, and not intended for publication. During this period, he participated in the activities of Nabajiban Sanghatana, a splinter communist group. He said that he liked sense of sacrifice and discipline of the communists.

Career

Early career 
Tendulkar began his career writing for newspapers. He had already written a play, Āmcyāvar Koṇ Preṃ Karṇār? ( Who is going to love me?), and he wrote the play, Gṛhastha (गृहस्थ; The Householder), in his early 20s. The latter did not receive much recognition from the audience, and he vowed never to write again.

Breaking the vow, in 1956 he wrote Śrīmant, which established him as a good writer. Śrīmant jolted the conservative audience of the times with its radical storyline, wherein an unmarried young woman decides to keep her unborn child while her rich father tries to "buy" her a husband in an attempt to save his social prestige.

Tendulkar's early struggle for survival and living for some time in tenements ("cāḷ/chawls") in Mumbai provided him first-hand experience about the life of urban lower middle class. He thus brought new authenticity to their depiction in Marathi theatre. Tendulkar's writings rapidly changed the storyline of modern Marathi theatre in the 1950s and the 60s, with experimental presentations by theatre groups like Rangayan. Actors in these theatre groups like Shriram Lagoo, Mohan Agashe, and Sulabha Deshpande brought new authenticity and power to Tendulkar's stories while introducing new sensibilities in Marathi theatre.

Tendulkar wrote the play Gidhāḍe (गिधाडे; The Vultures) in 1961, but it was not produced until 1970. The play was set in a morally collapsed family structure and explored the theme of violence. In his following creations, Tendulkar explored violence in its various forms: domestic, sexual, communal, and political. Thus, Gidhāḍe proved to be a turning point in Tendulkar's writings with regard to establishment of his own unique writing style.

Based on a 1956 short story, Die Panne ("Traps") by Friedrich Dürrenmatt, Tendulkar wrote the play, Śāntatā! Court Cālū Āhe (शांतता! कोर्ट चालू आहे; "Silence! The Court is in Session"). It was presented on the stage for the first time in 1967 and proved as one of his finest works. Satyadev Dubey presented it in movie form in 1971 with Tendulkar's collaboration as the screenplay writer.

1970s and 1980s
In his 1972 play, Sakhārām Binder (Sakhārām, the Binder), Tendulkar dealt with the topic of domination of the male gender over the female. The main character, Sakhārām, is a man devoid of ethics and morality, and professes not to believe in "outdated" social codes and conventional marriage. He accordingly uses the society for his own pleasure. He regularly gives "shelter" to abandoned wives and uses them for his sexual gratification while remaining oblivious to the emotional and moral implications of his exploits. He justifies all his acts through claims of modern, unconventional thinking, and comes up with hollow arguments meant in fact to enslave women. Paradoxically, some of the women which Sakhārām had enslaved buy into his arguments and simultaneously badly want freedom from their enslavement.

In 1972, Tendulkar wrote another, even much more acclaimed play, Ghāshirām Kotwāl ("Officer Ghāshirām"), which dealt with political violence. The play is a political satire created as a musical drama set in 18th century Pune. It combined traditional Marathi folk music and drama with contemporary theatre techniques, creating a new paradigm for Marathi theatre. The play demonstrates Tendulkar's deep study of group psychology, and it brought him a Jawaharlal Nehru Fellowship (1974–75) for a project titled, "An Enquiry into the Pattern of Growing Violence in Society and Its Relevance to Contemporary Theatre". With over 6,000 performances thus far in its original and translated versions, Ghāshirām Kotwāl remains one of the longest-running plays in the history of Indian theatre.

Tendulkar wrote screenplays for the movies Nishānt (1974), Ākrosh (The Cry) (1980), and Ardh Satya (The Half-Truth) (1984) which established him as an important "Chronicler of Violence" of the present. He has written eleven movies in Hindi and eight movies in Marathi. The latter include Sāmanā ("Confrontation") (1975), Simhāasan ("Throne") (1979), and Umbartha ("The Threshold") (1981). The last one is a groundbreaking feature film on women's activism in India. It was directed by Jabbar Patel and stars Smitā Pātil and Girish Karnād.

1990s to 2008
In 1991, Tendulkar wrote a metaphorical play, Safar, and in 2001 he wrote the play, The Masseur. He next wrote two novels —  Kādambari: Ek and Kādambari: Don — about sexual fantasies of an ageing man. In 2004, he wrote a single-act play, His Fifth Woman — his first play in the English language — as a sequel to his earlier exploration of the plight of women in Sakhārām Binder. This play was first performed at the Vijay Tendulkar Festival in New York in October 2004.

In the 1990s, Tendulkar wrote an acclaimed TV series, SwayamSiddha, in which his daughter Priyā Tendulkar, noted Television actress of 'Rajani' fame, performed in the lead role. His last screenplay was for Eashwar Mime Co. (2005), an adaptation of Dibyendu Palit's story, Mukhabhinoy, and directed by theatre director, Shyamanand Jalan and with Ashish Vidyarthi and Pawan Malhotra as leads.

Family
He was the brother of acclaimed cartoonist and humourist Mangesh Tendulkar.

Death

Tendulkar died in Pune on 19 May 2008, battling the effects of the rare autoimmune disease myasthenia gravis.

Tendulkar's son Raja and wife Nirmala had died in 2001; his daughter Priya Tendulkar died the next year (2002) of a heart attack following a long battle with breast cancer.

Comment on Post-Godhra communal carnage
Following the post-Godhra communal carnage in Gujarat in 2002, Tendulkar reacted by saying that "If I had a pistol, I would shoot [Gujarat Chief Minister] Narendra Modi". This reaction of Tendulkar had evoked mixed reactions, local Modi supporters burning his effigies while others lauding his remark.

Later, when he was asked if it was not strange that he, who was known as a strong voice against death penalty, had a death wish for Modi, Tendulkar had said that "it was spontaneous anger, which I never see as a solution for anything. Anger doesn't solve problems."

Legacy
In his writing career spanning more than five decades, Tendulkar has written 27 full-length plays and 25 one-act plays. Several of his plays have proven to be Marathi theatre classics. His plays have been translated and performed in many Indian languages.

By providing insight into major social events and political upheavals during his adult life, Tendulkar became one of the strongest radical political voices in Maharashtra in recent times. While contemporary writers were cautiously exploring the limits of social realism, he jumped into the cauldron of political radicalism and courageously exposed political hegemony of the powerful and the hypocrisies in the Indian social mindset. His powerful expression of human angst has resulted in his simultaneously receiving wide public acclaim and high censure from the orthodox and the political bigwigs.

Many of Tendulkar's plays derived inspiration from real-life incidents or social upheavals. Thus, the rise of Shiv Sena in Maharashtra in the 1970s was reflected in Tendulkar's Ghāshirām Kotwāl. The true story of a journalist who purchased of a woman from the rural sex industry to reveal police and political involvement in this trade, only to abandon the woman once he had no further need for her, is detailed in Tendulkar's Kamalā. The play was later made into a film Kamla (film). 
The real-life story of an actress whose acting career got ruined after her same-sex affair became public knowledge inspired Tendulkar to write Mitrāchi Goshta.

Tendulkar has translated nine novels, two biographies, and five plays by other authors into Marathi.

Besides the foregoing, Tendulkar's oeuvre includes a biography; two novels; five anthologies of short stories; 16 plays for children, including Bāle Miltāt (1960) and Pātlāchyā Poriche Lagin (1965); and five volumes of literary essays and social criticism, including Ratrani (1971), Kowali Unhe (1971), and Phuge Sobānche (1974). All in all, Tendulkar's writings have contributed to a significant transformation of the modern literary landscape in Marathi and other Indian languages.

In 2005, a documentary titled Tendulkar Āni Himsā: Kāl Āni Āj ("Tendulkar and Violence: Then and Now") with English subtitles (produced by California Arts Association - CalAA - directed by Atul Pethe) was released. In 2007, a short film about Tendulkar, Ankahin, (director Santosh Ayachit) was released.

Awards
Tendulkar won Maharashtra State government awards in 1969 and 1972; and Mahārāshtra Gaurav Puraskār in 1999. He was honoured with the Sangeet Nātak Akademi Award in 1970, and again in 1998 with the Academy's highest award for "lifetime contribution", the Sangeet Natak Akademi Fellowship ("Ratna Sadasya"). In 1984, he received the Padma Bhushan award from the Government of India for his literary accomplishments.

In 1977, Tendulkar won the National Film Award for Best Screenplay for his screenplay of Shyām Benegal'''s movie, Manthan (1976). He has written screenplays for many significant art movies, such as Nishānt, Ākrosh, Ardh Satya and Aghaat.

A comprehensive list of awards is given below:
 1970 Sangeet Nātak Akademi Award
 1970 Kamaladevi Chattopadhyay Award
 1977 National Film Award for Best Screenplay: Manthan
 1981 Filmfare Best Screenplay Award: Aakrosh
 1981 Filmfare Best Story Award: Aakrosh
 1983 Filmfare Best Screenplay Award: Ardh Satya
 1984 Padma Bhushan
 1993 Saraswati Samman
 1998 Sangeet Natak Akademi Fellowship
 1999 Kalidas Samman
 2001 Katha Chudamani Award
 2006 The Little Magazine SALAM Award

Bibliography
NovelsKādambari: Ek (Novel: One) (1996)Kādambari: Don (Novel: Two) (2005)

Short story anthologies
 Dwandwa (Duel) (1961)
 Phulāpākhare (Butterflies) (1970)

Plays
 Gruhastha (Householder) (1947)
 Shrimant (The Rich) (1956)
 Mānoos Nāwāche Bet (An Island Named 'Man') (1958)
 Thief! Police! Bāle Miltāt (1960)
 Gidhāde (The Vultures) (1961)
 Pātlāchyā Poriche Lagin (Marriage of a Village Mayor's Daughter) (1965)
 Shantata! Court Chalu Aahe(Hindi: Khāmosh! Adālat Jāri Hai) (Silence! The Court is in Session) (1967)
 Ajgar Ani Gandharwa (A Boa Constrictor and "Gandharwa")
 Sakharam Binder (Sakhārām, the Book-Binder) (1972)
 Kamalā ("Kamala") (1981)
 Mādi [in Hindi]
 Kanyādān (Giving Away of a Daughter in Marriage) (1983)
 Anji
 Dāmbadwichā Mukābalā (Encounter in Umbugland)
 Ashi Pākhare Yeti (Hindi: Panchi Aise Aate Hain) (Thus Arrive the Birds)
 Kutte
 Safar/Cyclewallah (The Cyclist) (1991)
 The Masseur (2001)
 Pāhije Jātiche (It Has to Be in One's Blood)
 Jāt Hi Poochho Sādhu Ki (Ask a Fakir's Lineage) 
 Mājhi Bahin (My Sister)
 Jhālā Ananta Hanumanta ("Infinite" Turned "Hanumanta")
 Footpāyrichā Samrāt (Sidewalk Emperor)
 Mitrāchi Goshta (A Friend's Story) (2001)
 Anand Owari [A play based on a novel by D. B. Mokashi]
 Bhāu MurārRāo
 Bhalyākākā
 Mee Jinkalo Mee Haralo (I won, I Lost)
 His Fifth Woman [in English] (2004)
 Bebi
 Mita ki kahani "(Mita's Story)
 Papa kho gaye

Musicals
Ghashiram Kotwal (Ghashiram, the Constable) (1972)

Translations
 Mohan Rakesh's Adhe Adhure (originally in Hindi)
 Girish Karnad's Tughlaq (originally in Kannada) Popular Prakashan Pvt. Ltd. .
 Tennessee Williams' A Streetcar Named Desire (originally in English)

Tendulkar's works available in English
 Silence! The Court Is in Session (Three Crowns). Priya Adarkar (Translator), Oxford University Press, 1979. .
 Ghashiram Kotwal, Sangam Books, 1984 .
 The Churning, Seagull Books, India, 1985 .
 The Threshold: (Umbartha - Screenplay), Shampa Banerjee (Translator), Sangam Books Ltd.,1985 .
 Five Plays (Various Translators), Bombay, Oxford University Press, 1992 .
 The Last Days of Sardar Patel and The Mime Players: Two Screen Plays New Delhi, Permanent Black, 2001 .
 Modern Indian Drama: An Anthology Sāhitya Akademi, India, 2001 .
 Mitrāchi Goshta : A Friend's Story: A Play in Three Acts Gowri Ramnarayan (Translator). New Delhi, Oxford University Press, 2001 .
 Kanyādān, Oxford University Press, India, New Ed edition, 2002 .
 Collected Plays in Translation New Delhi, 2003, Oxford University Press. .
 The Cyclist and His Fifth Woman: Two Plays by Vijay Tendulkar  Balwant Bhaneja (Translator), 2006 Oxford India Paperbacks .
 Sakharam Binder: Translated by Kumud Mehta and Shanta Gokhale.

Filmography

Screenplays
 Shantata! Court Chalu Aahe (Silence! The Court Is in Session) (1972)
 Nishant (End of Night) (1975)
 Samna (Confrontation) (1975)
 Manthan (Churning) (1976)
 Sinhasan (Throne) (1979)
 Gehrayee (The Depth) (1980)
 Aakrosh (Cry of the Wounded) (1980)
 Akriet (Unimaginable) (1981)
 Umbartha (The Threshold) (1981)
 Ardh Satya (Half Truth) (1983)
 Kamala (Kamala) (1984)
 Sardar (1993)
  Yeh Hai Chakkad Bakkad Bumbe Bo (2003)
  Eashwar Mime Co. (The Mime Players) (2005)

Dialogues
 Arvind Desai Ki Ajeeb Dastaan (1978)
 22 June 1897

See also
 List of Indian writers

References

Further reading
 Vijay Tendulkar. New Delhi, Katha, 2001. .
 Vijay Tendulkar's Ghashiram Kotwal: a Reader's Companion. M. Sarat Babu, Asia Book Club, 2003. 
 Vijay Tendulkar's Ghashiram Kotwal : Critical Perspectives, Vinod Bala Sharma and M. Sarat Babu. 2005, Prestige Books, New Delhi . .
 Vijay Tendulkar's Plays: An Anthology of Recent Criticism. V M Madge, 2007, Pencraft International. .
 An Interview with Vijay Tedulkar, The Indian Express, 20 October 1999
 Vijay Tendulkar chats on death penalty, 2004
 Vijay Tendulkar talks on his plays
 Jabbar Patel talks on Vijay Tendulkar plays

External links
 

Plays by Vijay Tendulkar
Marathi-language writers
Indian male screenwriters
Indian male dramatists and playwrights
Indian male essayists
Indian theatre directors
20th-century Indian translators
Marathi people
Deaths from myasthenia gravis
Indian atheists
1928 births
2008 deaths
People from Kolhapur
Recipients of the Padma Bhushan in arts
Recipients of the Saraswati Samman Award
Recipients of the Sangeet Natak Akademi Award
Marathi theatre
Jawaharlal Nehru Fellows
20th-century Indian dramatists and playwrights
Journalists from Maharashtra
20th-century Indian essayists
Screenwriters from Maharashtra
21st-century Indian dramatists and playwrights
21st-century Indian essayists
Dramatists and playwrights from Maharashtra
Best Original Screenplay National Film Award winners
20th-century Indian screenwriters
Recipients of the Sangeet Natak Akademi Fellowship